Elwira Lorenz (born 29 July 1962) is a Polish rower. She competed in the women's coxed four event at the 1988 Summer Olympics.

References

1962 births
Living people
Polish female rowers
Olympic rowers of Poland
Rowers at the 1988 Summer Olympics